Thundering Fleas is a 1926 Our Gang film directed by Robert F. McGowan. It was the 51st Our Gang short subject released.

Cast

The Gang
 Joe Cobb as Joe
 Jackie Condon as Jackie
 Mickey Daniels as Mickey
 Johnny Downs as Johnny
 Allen Hoskins as Farina
 Mary Kornman as Mary
 Scooter Lowry as Skooter
 Jay R. Smith as Jay
 Jannie Hoskins as Mango
 Clifton Young as Bonedust
 Buster the Dog as Magnolia

Additional cast
 Lassie Lou Ahern as Flower girl
 Harry Bowen as Flea circus spectator
 Sammy Brooks Flea circus spectator
 Allan Cavan as Father of the bride
 Charley Chase as Mustachioed wedding guest
 James Finlayson as Justice of the Peace
 Robert Finlayson as Musician
 George B. French as Professor Clements
 Dick Gilbert as Skooter's father
 Charlie Hall as Musician
 Oliver Hardy as Officer
 Ham Kinsey as Extra at the wedding
 Mildred Kornman as Skooter's sister
 Sam Lufkin as Extra at the wedding
 Jerry Mandy as Sheldon, the groom
 Martha Sleeper as Bride
 Lyle Tayo as Pedestrian without fleas
 Charley Young as Flea circus spectator

See also
 Our Gang filmography
 Oliver Hardy filmography

References

External links

1926 films
1926 short films
American silent short films
American black-and-white films
Hal Roach Studios short films
Films directed by Robert F. McGowan
Our Gang films
1926 comedy films
1920s American films
Silent American comedy films
1920s English-language films